The Journal of Neurotherapy: Investigations in Neuromodulation, Neurofeedback and Applied Neuroscience was a scientific journal for the study and application of neuromodulation and neurofeedback. On December 4, 2013, in volume 17, issue 4, the editor announced that no more issues would be published.  It was published quarterly by Taylor & Francis. The journal provided a multidisciplinary perspective on research, treatment, and public policy for neurotherapy. It is indexed by PsycINFO, Excerpta Medica, Scopus, and Ulrichs.

The founding editor for this journal was David Trudeau in 1995.

References

External links
 Website of the International Society for Neurofeedback and Research which had supported the journal

Neurology journals
Psychiatry journals
English-language journals
Publications established in 1995
Quarterly journals